Natalia Evgenyevna Bazhanova (née Korsakova; in Russian: Наталья Евгеньевна Бажанова (девичья фамилия Корсакова); 4 January 1947 – 7 June 2014) was an influential Russian political scientist, historian, economist, educator, writer, and diplomat.

She gained wider prominence through her works on Korea, China, the United States, and a post-Cold War world order: Between Dead Dogmas and Practical Requirements. External Economic Relations of North Korea (1992); The Most Mysterious War of the XX Century (Korean Conflict 1950–1953) (1997); Chinese Mosaic (2011); America: Yesterday and Today, Volumes 1, 2 (2005); International Relations in the XXI century (2011) etc.

Career 

1954–1964 – Secondary and high schools student in Baku and Moscow, graduated with distinction.

1964–1969 – Student of Moscow State Institute of International Relations (MGIMO), majoring in Asian studies and world economy, graduated with distinction.

1969–1973 – Senior Researcher, Institute of Oriental Studies, USSR Academy of Sciences.

1974 – Successfully completed her Ph.D. at the Institute of Oriental Studies, USSR Academy of Sciences. The title: "The Role of Soviet-Korean Economic Cooperation in the Development of North Korea’s Economy".

1973–1979 – Press Attaché of the USSR Consulate General in San Francisco (USA).

1979–1981 – Leading Researcher,  Institute of Oriental Studies, USSR Academy of Sciences.

1981–1985 – Press Attaché of the USSR Embassy in Beijing (China).

1985–1993 – Leading Researcher, Institute of Oriental Studies, USSR/Russian Academy of Sciences.

1993–2014 – Consultant of the Center of Asian-Pacific Studies, The Diplomatic Academy, Ministry of Foreign Affairs of the Russian Federation.

2003 – Received her doctorate in Pusan, South Korea. The title: "The Economic System of North Korea (Sources, Evolution, Main Characteristics, Structure, Methods of Management, Weak Points, Prospects of Reforms)".

Foreign languages: Korean, English, French, Chinese.

Family 
Parents. Father: Evgeny Pavlovich Korsakov (1917–1990), sea captain, Chief Inspector of the USSR State Committee on Labor and Wages. Mother: Nina Antonovna Korsakova (née Klenovskya) (1921–2005), physician, Therapy Department Head, Botkin Hospital, Moscow.

Husband: Evgeny Petrovich Bazhanov (b. 1946), President of the Diplomatic Academy of the Ministry of Foreign Affairs of the Russian Federation, political scientist, historian, educator, writer, and diplomat.

Academic activities 
Natalia Bazhanova delivered more than 200 lectures at over 60 universities, colleges and research centers in 22 countries, including Harvard, Columbia, Stanford, and George Washington Universities, University of California, RAND, Cambridge, Oxford, Beijing, Tokyo, Seoul National, Australian National Universities, made over 100 presentations at multinational conferences and gave more than 400 interviews to TV, radio, newspapers, and magazines in 30 countries.

She was the academic advisor of 28 Ph.D. candidates, including President of South Korea Kim Dae-jung, Prime Minister of Kazakhstan Kassym-Jomart Tokayev, Foreign Minister of Kyrgyzstan Alikbek Jekshenkulov, Ambassadors to Russia of Yemen, United Arab Emirates, and Palestine, and many prominent Russian politicians, educators, and diplomats.

Dr. Bazhanova is the author of 31 books, more than 30 book chapters and parts and over 420 articles on Chinese, Korean, Japanese, ASEAN, Asia-Pacific, U.S., European, Middle Eastern affairs, foreign policies and domestic issues of Russia, CIS countries (published in Russia, U.S., ROK, PRC, Taiwan, Japan, Australia, Hong Kong, New Zealand, Germany, Britain, Singapore, Thailand, Israel, Egypt, Spain, Italy, Turkey, Austria, Iran, Switzerland, Yugoslavia, Syria). She edited 43 books and other publications, was a member of editorial boards of several magazines, as well as a columnist of a number of South Korean and Taiwanese newspapers.

Published Books 
 The Gilded Ghetto (Chinese, Korean, and Japanese Communities in the USA). Moscow: Nauka, 1983, co-author Evgeny Bazhanov, under pennames N.E. Korsakova, E.P. Sevastyanov.
 The Last Frontier (American Society in the 1970s). Moscow: Politisdat, 1984, co-author Evgeny Bazhanov.
 Between Dead Dogmas and Practical Requirements. External Economic Relations of North Korea. Seoul: The Korea Economic Daily, 1992, in Korean.
 Russia and Korea. Seoul: Seoul Sihnmun, 1992, co-author Evgeny Bazhanov, in Korean.
 External Economic Relations of North Korea. Looking for a Way Out of a Deadend. Moscow: Nauka, 1993.
 Soviet Foreign Policy under Gorbachev. Taipei (Taiwan): Zhongyang Ribao, 1993, in Chinese.
 Russia's Changing Foreign Policy. Köln: Bundesinstitut für ostwissenschaftliche und internationale Studien (BIOST), 1996. ISSN 0435-7183.
 The Most Mysterious War of the XX Century (Korean Conflict 1950–1953), Seoul: Youl Rim, 1997, in Korean.
 Russian-Chinese Relations: Problems and Prospects. Moscow: Nauchnya Kniga, 1999.
 The DPRK Reports (NN 1–21), Center for Nonproliferation Studies, The Monterey Institute of International Studies. Monterey, California, USA, 1996–2000.
 Studies in Contemporary International Development. Volume 1. Moscow: Nauchnaya Kniga, 2001–2002, co-author Evgeny Bazhanov. .
 Studies in Contemporary International Development. Volume 2. Moscow: Nauchnaya Kniga,  2001–2002, co-author Evgeny Bazhanov. .
 Studies in Contemporary International Development. Volume 3. Moscow: Nauchnaya Kniga, 2001–2002, co-author Evgeny Bazhanov. .
 Contemporary World. Moscow: Izvestia, 2004, co-author Evgeny Bazhanov. .
 America: Yesterday and Today. Volume 1. Moscow: Izvestia, 2005, co-author Evgeny Bazhanov. .
 America: Yesterday and Today. Volume 2. Moscow: Izvestia, 2005, co-author Evgeny Bazhanov. .
 Oriental Express with Stops in the West. The Eyewitness' Notes. Moscow: Vostok-Zapad, 2008, co-author Evgeny Bazhanov. .
 Edible Dragons. Mysteries of the Chinese Cuisine. Moscow: Vostok-Zapad, 2008, co-author Evgeny Bazhanov. .
 Chinese Riddles. On Chinese Language, Characters, Calligraphy, and the View of the World "Through Characters". Moscow: Vostok-Zapad, 2008, co-author Evgeny Bazhanov. .
 A Country of Merry Gods. Religious World of the Chinese People. Moscow: Vostok-Zapad, 2008, co-author Evgeny Bazhanov. .
 France. Both Quazimodo and Coco Chanel. Moscow: Vostok-Zapad, 2009, co-author Evgeny Bazhanov. .
 Where is Mankind Headed? Trends in International Relations in the XXI century. Moscow: Vostok-Zapad, 2009, co-author Evgeny Bazhanov. .
 Wisdom of the Orient and the West. World Folklore. Moscow: Vostok-Zapad, 2010, co-authors Peter Bazhanov and Evgeny Bazhanov. .
 The Multipolar World. Moscow: Vostok-Zapad, 2010, co-author Evgeny Bazhanov. .
 Sketches of Korea. Moscow: Vostok-Zapad, 2010, co-author Evgeny Bazhanov. .
 International Relations in the XXI Century. Moscow: Vostok-Zapad, 2011, co-author Evgeny Bazhanov. .
 Chinese Mosaic. Moscow: Vostok-Zapad, 2011, co-author Evgeny Bazhanov. .
 Peace and War. Moscow: Vostok-Zapad, 2011, co-author Evgeny Bazhanov. .
 Italy, both Sad and Merry. Travel Notes. Moscow: Vostok-Zapad, 2011, co-author Evgeny Bazhanov. .
 The Clash and the Dialogue of Civilizations. Moscow: Ves Mir, 2013, co-author Evgeny Bazhanov. .
 Wisdom of the Orient and the West. World Folklore. Moscow: Ves Mir, 2014, co-authors Peter Bazhanov and Evgeny Bazhanov. .

Studies 
1. Russian Foreign Policy and Domestic Situation. Implications for the APR. A Report. Canberra: Australian National University, 1992.

2. Russian Foreign Policy Priorities and Potential for the Development of Cooperation between Russia and Republic of Korea. Prepared for the Association of Russian Banks. Moscow, 1997, March.

3. Markets of the Countries of the Asia-Pacific Region: Opportunities and Steps to Implement them. Prepared for the Association of the Russian Banks. Moscow. 1997, May.

4-10. People's University / Xinhua. Beijing, China

1998

Russia and Korea. — 17 January.

Financial Crisis in Asia. — 24 June.

Forecasts of the Developments in the DPRK. — 24 June.

1999

Russian Assessments of US-DPRK Relations. — 1 February.

North Korean Position on Missile/Nuclear Weapons. — 20 September.

2000

DPRK Foreign Policy. — 2 March.

Russia's Foreign Policy Strategy. — 8 June.

11-15. University of Madrid. Madrid, Spain (1998—2000).

1998

North Korea after the Supreme People's Assembly Session. — 5 October.

1999

Relations of the DPRK with the US, Japan and the ROK. — 15 February.

Korea. — 12 May.

The Korean Problem. — 13 September.

2000

InterKorean Summit. — 15 June.

16. Russia and Korea in Regional Political Context. A Conference Paper. Princeton University, 2003.

17. Russia and Korea. Columbia University, 2003.

18. Soviet policy Towards the Asia-Pacific Region. Princeton University, 2005.

Memberships 
 The World Political Science Association, since 1973.
 World Affairs Council of Northern California, USA, since 1973.
 The Association for Asian Studies, since 1975.
 The International Social Sciences Association, since 1975.
 Executive Committee, World Affairs Council of Northern Califorinia, USA, 1976–1979.
 Association for Dialogue and Cooperation in the Asia-Pacific Region, Member of the Presidium, Russia, since 1991.
 World Ecological Academy, Moscow, Russia, since 1993.
 Academy of Humanitarian Studies, Moscow, Russia, since 1997.
 Russia's Association of International Studies. Member of the Presidium, Moscow, Russia, since 1999.
 The Consultative Board of Publishing Authority of the George C. Marshall Center, Garmisсh-Partenkirchen, Bavaria, Germany, since 2000.
 Bureau of Scientific Council of the Russian Academy of Sciences, Moscow, Russia, since 2002.
 The Scientific Council, The Institute for Applied International Studies, Moscow, Russia, since 2002.
 Academic Council of the Center for Contemporary Korean Studies, Moscow, Russia, since 2002.
 The Editorial Board of The Pacific Focus journal, Inha University, Incheon, S. Korea, since 2004.
 Presidium of the Russian Council for Cooperation and Security in the Asia-Pacific Region, since 2010.
 The Board of Higher School of Geopolitics and Applied Sciences, Rome, Italy, since 2012.
 The Advisory Board of the Korea National Diplomatic Academy, Seoul, Republic of Korea, since 2012.

Awards and Recognitions 
 1993. Journalistic Prize. Zhongyang Zhibao newspaper, Taipei, Taiwan.
 Honorary Doctor of Seoul National University, Seoul, S. Korea, 1997.
 Honorary Doctor of Beijing University, Beijing, China, 1998.
 1997. Journalistic Prize, Kyunghyang Shinmun newspaper, Seoul, S. Korea.
 1999. Journalistic Prize, Seoul Shinmun // Taehan Maeil newspaper, Seoul, S. Korea.
 Inaugural Member of the International Biographical Center (IBC), Leading Scientists of the World, Cambridge, England, since 2006.
 Honorary Counsellor to the All-China History Society, Beijing, China, since 2012.
 Honorary Professor of the Moscow International Higher School of Business, Moscow, since 2012.
 Honorary Doctor of The Diplomatic Academy of the Ministry of Foreign Affairs of the Russian Federation, Moscow, Russia, 2014.

Reviews of scholarly and literary works 
Over 150 reviews of scholarly and literary works of Natalia Bazhanova have been published in scholarly and general media, including:
 Myasnikov V.S. In the Gleam of the Others’ Gold. Review of: The Gilded Ghetto (Chinese, Korean and Japanese Communities in the USA). Moscow: Nauka, 1983, co-author Bazhanov E.P., under pennames N.E.Korsakova, E.P.Sevastyanov  //  Problemy Dalnego Vostoka (Moscow). 1984, No. 3, pp. 181–184.
 Denisov V.I. The Realities of the American Way of Life. Review of: The Last Frontier. (American Society in the 1970s). Moscow: Politisdat, 1984, co-author Evgeny Bazhanov  // Mezhdunarodnaya zhizn. 1985. No. 11, pp. 143–144.
 Reviews of the book by Bazhanova N.E.: Between Dead Dogmas and Practical Requirements. External Economic Relations of North Korea. Seoul, 1992, in Korean // The Korea Economic Daily (Seoul, South Korea). 1993, 6 January, in Korean.
 Kravchenko I.N. Scholarly Analysis of the Key Problems of the Contemporary World. Review of: Studies in Contemporary International Development. Volume 1. Moscow: Nauchnaya Kniga, 2001, co-author Bazhanov E.P. // Diplomaticheskiy vestnik (Moscow). 2001, December, No. 12, pp. 178–180.
 Volokhova A.A. Review of: Studies in Contemporary International Development. Volumes 1–3. Moscow: Nauchnaya Kniga, 2001–2002, co-author Bazhanov E.P. // Problemy Dalnego Vostoka (Moscow). 2002, No. 3, pp. 165–166.
 Yaskina G. Russia Becomes More Active in Asia. Review of: Studies in Contemporary International Development. Volumes 1–3. Moscow: Nauchnaya Kniga, 2001–2002, co-author Bazhanov E.P. // Aziya i Afrika segodnya (Moscow). 2002, No. 7, p. 68.
 Kosolapov N. A Contemporary's Testimony as a Fact of History. Review of: Studies in Contemporary International Development. Volumes 1–3. Moscow: Nauchnaya Kniga, 2001–2002, co-author Bazhanov E.P. // Mirovaya ekonomika i mezhdunarodniye otnosheniya (Moscow). 2004, No. 2, pp. 119–122.
 Volokhova A.A. Review of: Contemporary World. Moscow: Izvestia, 2004, co-author Bazhanov E.P. // Problemy Dalnego Vostoka (Moscow). 2004.  Volume 32, No. 4, pp. 124–126.
 Zvereva T. Russia and the World Community through the Eyes of a Scholar and a Diplomat. Review of: Contemporary World. Moscow: Izvestia, 2004, co-author Bazhanov E.P. // Mirovaya ekonomika i mezhdunarodniye otnosheniya (Moscow). 2005, No. 6, pp. 119–124.
 Shutov A.D. An Encyclopedia of American Life. Review of: America: Yesterday and Today. Volumes 1–2. Moscow: Izvestia, 2005, co-author Bazhanov E.P. // Politicheskiy zhurnal (Moscow). 2005, No. 41 (97), 5 December, p. 75.
 Moraru V. An Ambiguous Image of "Superpower". Review of: America: Yesterday and Today. Volumes 1–2. Moscow: Izvestia, 2005, co-author Bazhanov E.P. // Nezavisimaya Moldova (Kishinev). 2006, 26 February, p. 3.
 Denisov V.I. America Yesterday and Today. Review of America: Yesterday and Today. Volumes 1–2. Moscow: Izvestia, 2005, co-author Bazhanov E.P. // Mezhdunarodnaya zhizn (Moscow). 2006, No. 3, pp. 88–94.
 Zvereva T.V. How to Put a Superpower in Order. Review of America: Yesterday and Today. Volumes 1–2. Moscow: Izvestia, 2005, co-author Bazhanov E.P. // Mirovaya ekonomika i mezhdunarodniye otnosheniya (Moscow). 2007, No. 2, pp. 118–125.

References

Bibliography in Memoriam

Titles 
1. Honorary Doctor of the Diplomatic Academy of the Ministry of Foreign Affairs of the Russian Federation (Decision of the Academic Council of the Diplomatic Academy, MFA, Russia, on 23 June 2014).

2. Bestowing of the name of Honorary Doctor of the Diplomatic Academy of the Ministry of Foreign Affairs of the Russian Federation Natalia Evgenievna Bazhanova on the Center of Eurasian Studies of the Institute of Contemporary International Studies (Decision of the Academic Council of the Diplomatic Academy, MFA, Russia, on 28 January 2015).

Dedications 
1. Neimark, Mark, editor. Contemporary World and Geopolitics. Moscow: Kanon+ Publishers, ROOI "Reabilitatsiya", 2015. "Dedicated to the Memory of Natalia Evgenievna Bazhanova, a Scholar and a Person, Honorary Doctor of the Diplomatic Academy of the MFA of the RF".

2. Certificate of inclusion of the record of giving the name of "Natalia" to the ninth magnitude star in the constellation of Scorpio with the coordinates: α = 73.731374o, δ = 23.519172o, into "International Database of Planets and Stars & Extraterrestrial Land Claims". The owner of the name-bearing star: Evgeny Petrovich Bazhanov. The registration data included via Stars International LLC. Number: S-09-6475-66. Date: 28.12.2015.

Posthumous awards 
1. Honorary Diploma of "Predstavitelnaya vlast" ("Representative Power") journal for "Outstanding achievements in the field of scholarly and journalistic activities, theoretical studies, science, education, diplomacy, establishment and development of relations with the leading research and educational centers and publishing houses".

Awarded: Honorary Doctor of the Diplomatic Academy of the Ministry of Foreign Affairs of the RF, Doctor of Science (Economics) Bazhanova Natalia Evgenievna.

5 June 2015.

2. Official ceremony of awarding of "Eurasian Prize" for the Gold Laureate in the nomination of "Science special prize" to Honorary Doctor of the Diplomatic Academy of the Ministry of Foreign Affairs of the RF Bazhanova Natalia Evgenievna. Prize founder: the Eurasian Creative Union. Venue: The Diplomatic Academy of the MFA of the RF, 4 September 2015.

3. "Terra Incognita" Prize and Diploma "For unique achievements in the field of culture and tireless work to preserve the diversity of the cultural and scientific space" in the nomination of "Patterns of Culture" awarded to Natalia Bazhanova for the book "Italy, both Sad and Merry". 2015.

Memorial events 
1.  Commemoration. Troekurovo Cemetery. The Diplomatic Academy of the MFA of the RF, "Consul" Restaurant. 10 June 2014.

2.  Nine Days Commemoration. Troekurovo Cemetery. "China Dream" Restaurant. 15 June 2014.

3.  Forty Days Commemoration. Troekurovo Cemetery. "Tsar’s Hunt" Restaurant. 16 July 2014.

4.  Memorial Evening. Ladies’ Sitting Room of the Diplomatic Club of "Biblio Globus" book store. 18 December 2014.

5.  Memorial Day. One Year. Troekurovo Cemetery. The Diplomatic Academy of the MFA of the RF, "Khalva" Restaurant. 7 June 2015.

6.  Official opening of the Memorial to Natalia Evgenievna Bazhanova. Troekurovo Cemetery. The Diplomatic Academy of the MFA of the RF, "Khalva" Restaurant. 14 May 2016.

7.  Memorial Day. Two Years. Troekurovo Cemetery. The Diplomatic Academy of the MFA of the RF, "Consul" Restaurant. Blue Room. 7 June 2016.

8.  Memorial Evening to celebrate the 70th Anniversary of Natalia Bazhanova. "National" Hotel. Moscow Hall. 4 January 2007.

Presentations of books 
1.  Presentation of the book "Natalia Bazhanova: A Radiant Life" at the "Russia and Iran: Interaction of Cultures" Forum organized by "Biblio Globus" book store at the 28th International Moscow Book Exhibition Fair. All-Russia Exhibition of Achievements of National Economy (VDNKh), pavilion 74. 4 September 2015.

2.  Presentation of the book "Natalia Bazhanova: A Radiant Life". Diplomatic Academy of the MFA of the RF. 24 September 2015.

3.  Presentation of the book "Natalia Bazhanova: A Radiant Life". Diplomatic Club of "Biblio Globus" book store. 21 October 2015.

4.  Presentation of the book "Natalia Bazhanova: A Radiant Life" by First Vice President of the Diplomatic Academy of the MFA of the RF Tatiana Zakaurtseva. Middlebury Institute of International Studies in Monterey. California, USA. 17 November 2015.

5.  Presentation of the book "Natalia Bazhanova: A Radiant Life". National Library of Belarus. Minsk, Republic of Belarus. 3 December 2015.

6.  Presentation of the book "Natalia Bazhanova: A Radiant Life". Academy of Government under the President of the Republic of Belarus. Minsk, Republic of Belarus. 4 December 2015.

7.  Presentation of the book "Natalia Bazhanova: A Radiant Life". International conference on "The Migration Crisis and the Struggle against Xenophobia and Neo-Fascism" attended by scientists, historians, diplomats, representatives of state, political and public institutions from Bulgaria, Russia, Belarus, Germany, Austria, Hungary, Poland, Serbia, Slovenia, Montenegro, Turkey and Iran. Presentation made by Director of the Center of World Cultures of the Diplomatic Academy of the MFA of the RF Natalia Maslakova-Klauberg. Sofia, Bulgaria. 12 December 2015.

8.  Presentation of the book "Natalia Bazhanova: A Radiant Life". Moderators: Suzanna Mkrtycheva, Evgeny Bazhanov. IV International Saint Petersburg Cultural Forum. "Russia – Iran. Bridges of Culture" Round Table. Saint Petersburg. 15 December 2015.

9.  Presentation of the book "Natalia Bazhanova: A Radiant Life". Moderators: Suzanna Mkrtycheva, Evgeny Bazhanov. IV International Saint Petersburg Cultural Forum. "Russia – China. Development Trends. Bridges of Culture" Round Table. Saint Petersburg. 16 December 2015.

10.  Presentation of the book "Natalia Bazhanova: A Radiant Life". Library of the UN Office in Geneva. Palace of Nations. Geneva, Switzerland. Presentation by Library Director V.Chikvadze. 28 December 2015 and 4 January 2016.

11.  Presentation of the book "Natalia Bazhanova: A Radiant Life". M.Rudomino Library for Foreign Literature. Oval Hall. Moscow. 4 February 2016.

12.  Presentation of the book "Natalia Bazhanova: A Radiant Life". International Multi Media Press Center. "Russia Today" International News Agency. Moscow. 9 February 2016.

13.  Presentation of the book "Natalia Bazhanova: A Radiant Life". State Public Science and Technology Library (GPNTB). Moscow. 3 March 2016.

14.  Presentation of the books "Natalia Bazhanova: A Radiant Life" and "A Moment and Eternity" (vv. 1 and 2). Organized by "Biblio Globus" book store at the 28th Moscow International Book Exhibition Fair, VDNKh, pavilion 75. 7 September 2016.

15.  Presentation of the book "A Moment and Eternity" (vv. 1 and 2). First international diplomatic workshop "Russia and Germany: Diplomacy of the Past and Prospects for Interrelations in the 21st Century". Organized by the Representative Office of Rossotrudnichestvo RDNK jointly with the Diplomatic Academy, MFA, Russia. Presentation made by Director of the Center of World Cultures of the Diplomatic Academy of the MFA of the RF Natalia Maslakova-Klauberg. Berlin, Germany. 7 October 2016.

16.  Presentation of the books "Natalia Bazhanova: A Radiant Life" and "A Moment and Eternity" (vv. 1 and 2). Berlin – Saint Petersburg – Moscow TV Bridge on "Electronic Space of Knowledge from Russia". Boris Yeltsin Presidential Library. Saint Petersburg. 17 October 2016.

17.  Presentation of the books "Natalia Bazhanova: A Radiant Life" and "A Moment and Eternity" (vv. 1 and 2). Interview to "Vestnik Kavkaza" ("Herald of Caucasus") Information and Analysis Agency's Editor-in-Chief M.S.Sidelnikova. Agency Office, Moscow. 20 October 2016.

18.  Presentation of the book "A Moment and Eternity" (vv. 1, 2, 3, 4). The Diplomatic Academy of the MFA of the RF. Moscow. 1 December 2016.

19.  Presentation of the books "Natalia Bazhanova: A Radiant Life" and "A Moment and Eternity" (vv. 1, 2, 3, 4). Ceremony of awarding Peter Bazhanov Prize "For support of Cultural Initiatives" in 2016. Alisa Debolskaya Organ and Classical Music Hall. Sochi. 25 January 2017.

20.  Presentation of the books "Natalia Bazhanova: A Radiant Life" and "A Moment and Eternity" (vv. 1, 2, 3, 4). Winter Theatre. Sochi. 26 January 2017.

Lectures 
1. "Tatiana Zakaurtseva. "Tracing the Evolution of Russian Foreign Policy Doctrine from 2008 to 2015. Delivered within the frameworks of the annual program "Lectures in Memory of Natalia Bazhanova". Middlebury Institute of International Studies in Monterey, California, USA. 17 November 2015.

2. Evgeny Bazhanov. "Natalia Bazhanova’s Role in Understanding Korea". Evening program dedicated to the Democratic People's Republic of Korea. The Diplomatic Club of "Biblio Globus" book store. Moscow. 16 February 2016.

3. Evgeny Bazhanov. Natasha Bazhanova's Contribution to Korean Studies and to the Development of Cooperation between Russia and Two Koreas. The Third Korean-Russian Humanitarian Friendship Bridge. Learning more about each other. Organized by Korea Foundation, Hankook University and Association of Korean language teachers of Russian universities. The Diplomatic Academy of the MFA of the RF. Moscow. 18 November 2016.

Foundations and associations 
The Natalia Bazhanova Foundation for Promotion of Academic Studies and Education was registered on 21 January 2016.

Memorial prizes 
1. Professor Natalia Evgenievna Bazhanova Honorary Doctor of the Diplomatic Academy of the MFA of the RF Prize awarded to Dorofeeva Maria Sergeevna for the best master's degree dissertation of 2015 "Energy Factor in the Foreign Policy of Russia and in the Russia – EU Relations". Awarding ceremony: 23 June 2015.

2. Professor Natalia Evgenievna Bazhanova Honorary Doctor of the Diplomatic Academy of the MFA of the RF Prize "For the best Master degree dissertation in the field of Oriental studies". Established by the decision of the Academic Council of the Diplomatic Academy on 10 June 2015.  It is awarded annually in three nominations:
For the best Master's dissertation in the field of Oriental studies on "International Relations".
For the best Master's dissertation in the field of Oriental studies on "Economics and Administration".
For the best Master's dissertation in the field of Oriental studies on "Jurisprudence".

Prize is awarded together with a monetary bonus.

3. The Natalia Bazhanova Prize for the study "Ways of Further Development of BRICS". Official ceremony of awarding the Natalia Bazhanova Prize to the winners of the Competition of Young Diplomats of the BRICS Countries for the best analytical study on "Ways of Further Development of BRICS". Forum of Young Diplomats of the BRICS Countries. Diplomatic Academy, MFA, Russia. 28 October 2015. Three awards. All other participants (11 persons) received certificates and the book "The Tender World of Natalia Bazhanova".

4. Professor Natalia Evgenievna Bazhanova Honorary Doctor of the Diplomatic Academy of the MFA of the RF Prize "For the best Master degree dissertation" awarded:

in "Economics and Administration" to: Baranova, Olga Dmitrievna: "Assessment of the Export Potential of the Chemical Industry of the Russian Federation to the Countries of the Asia-Pacific Region in the Context of Contemporary Challenges and Threats"

in ‘International Relations" to: Zhivotenkov, Alexander Nikolaevich: "Specifics of the Foreign Policy of the Islamic Republic of Iran in Contemporary Conditions: Palestinian Aspect"

Suleimanov, Timur Irekovich: "Soft Power in the Foreign Policy of the Republic of Korea"

in "Jurisprudence" to: Sukovitsyn, Viktor Viktorovich: "Treaty as a Source of International Law"

Awarding ceremony: 27 June 2016. Awards presented by: Igor Morgulov, Evgeny Bazhanov.

Biographies 
1.  Bazhanov, Evgeny. Editor-in-Chief. Natalia Bazhanova: A Radiant Life. Compilers: A.Yu.Chudoeev, I.N.Epifanova, P.A.Razvin, I.L.Benderskiy. With participation of A.F.Smirnova, T.D.Polyanskaya, P.G.Kabanen, A.S.Kuleshova, V.P.Novikova, I.V.Frolova. In two books. Book One. Moscow, Ves Mir. 2015. – 622 pp. Book Two. Moscow, Ves Mir. 2015. – 546 pp.

2.  The second printing of the same monograph. In two books. Book One. Moscow, EKSMO Publishers. 2016. – 622 pp. Book Two. Moscow, EKSMO Publishers. 2016. – 546 pp.

3.  Bazhanov, Evgeny. A Moment and Eternity. The Story of One Life and Observations of the Whole Mankind's Life. Volume 1: Part 1. Specs of the Past. Part 2. In the Melting Pot of America. Moscow, Dashkov and Co Publishing and Trade Corporation. 2016 – 696 pp.

4.  Bazhanov, Evgeny. A Moment and Eternity. The Story of One Life and Observations of the Whole Mankind's Life. Volume 2: Part 3. Correspondence across the Ocean. Part 4. Back in the Motherland. Moscow, Dashkov and Co Publishing and Trade Corporation. 2016 – 656 pp.

5.  Bazhanov, Evgeny. A Moment and Eternity. The Story of One Life and Observations of the Whole Mankind's Life. Volume 3: Part 5. Behind the Great Wall of China. Moscow, Dashkov and Co Publishing and Trade Corporation. 2017 – 559 pp.

6.  Bazhanov, Evgeny. A Moment and Eternity. The Story of One Life and Observations of the Whole Mankind's Life. Volume 4: Part 6. Soul Vibrations. Moscow, Dashkov and Co Publishing and Trade Corporation. 2017 – 239 pp.

7.  Bazhanov, Evgeny. A Moment and Eternity. The Story of One Life and Observations of the Whole Mankind's Life. Volume 5: Part 7. Broken Dreams. Moscow, Dashkov and Co Publishing and Trade Corporation. 2017 – 525 pp.

8.  Bazhanov, Evgeny. A Moment and Eternity. The Story of One Life and Observations of the Whole Mankind's Life. Volume 6: Part 8. Under Different Banners. Part 9. On the Worldwide Orbit. Moscow, Dashkov and Co Publishing and Trade Corporation. 2017 – 384 pp.

9.  Bazhanov, Evgeny. Natalia Bazhanova: A Radiant Life. Edited by Evgeny Bazhanov, Moscow, "EKSMO". 2017 – 648 pp.

Articles 
1.  In Memoriam. In Memory of Natalia Bazhanova. Nezavisimaya Gazeta–Dipkurier. No. 11, 16 June 2014, p. 10.

2.  Bazhanov, Evgeny. The Highest Mark for Natasha. Planet’s Echo. No. 23, 19–25 June 2014, pp. 40–43.

3.  Torkunov, Anatoly. On Natalia Bazhanova's Intellectual Legacy. International Life. No. 7, July 2014, pp. 168–173.

4.  The article above (No. 3) was reprinted in: Russian Council on International Affairs. Education and Science. Comments. 1 August 2014.

5.  The Personality. In Memory of Natalia Bazhanova. Sochi News. No. 115–116, 16–17 July 2014, p. 15.

6.  Russia and the World. Herald of the Diplomatic Academy of the MFA of the RF. Russia and the World. No. 1, 2014, pp. 7–20.

In Memoriam.

Documents on granting the title of the Honorary Doctor of the Diplomatic Academy of Ministry of Foreign Affairs of the RF.

Bazhanov, Evgeny. The Highest Mark for Natasha.

Bendersky, Igor. In Memory of Natalia Bazhanova.

7. Razvin, Peter. Harmony of Science and Faith (Remembering Natalia Bazhanova). Diplomatic Service. No. 5, 2014, pp. 12–15.

8. Lyubimov, Alexey. The Intellectual Legacy of Professor N.E.Bazhanova Is a National Heritage of Russia. Representative Power. No. 4(131), 2014, pp. 1–5.

9. Natalia Bazhanova: A Radiant Life. Biblio-Globus Book Digest. No. 12–01, December–January 2014/2015, pp. 9–11.

10. Avdeev, Alexander. My Wonderful Classmate. Russia in Global Affairs. Vol. 12, September–October 2014, pp. 218–220.

11. Zvereva, Tatyana. In Memoriam. Internationally Renowned Scholar. Bulletin of RUDN. Series in International Relations. No. 3, 2014, pp. 196–215.

12. Mlechin, Leonid and Deryugina, Olga. In Memory of Natalia E. Bazhanova. Observer. No. 12, December 2014, pp. 114–122.

13. Natalia Bazhanova: A Radiant Life. Creative Economy. No. 11, 2014, pp. 3–7.

14. Motrenko, Elena. The Teacher of the President. Vechernyaya Moskva. No. 50, 18–25 December 2014, pp. 42–43.

15. Chudodeev, Alexander, and Bazhanov, Evgeny. Tour of a Lifetime. Interview. Russia and the World. Herald of the Diplomatic Academy of the MFA of the RF. Russia and the World. No. 2, 2014, pp. 7–20.

16. Benderskiy, Igor. In Memory of a Scholar. Geopolitical Journal. No. 6, 2014, pp. 93–94.

17. Manilov, Alexander. Mosaic of Fate. Border Guard of the Commonwealth. No. 4, 2014, p. 56.

18. Morgulov, Igor. Natasha Remains with Us. Geopolitical Journal. No. 7, 2014, pp. 99–103.

19. Avdeev, Alexander. My Wonderful Classmate. Geopolitical Journal. No. 7, 2014, pp. 104–105.

20. Benderskiy, Igor. In Memory of a Scholar. An Example of Scientific Integrity. Problems of Post-Soviet Space. No. 2, 2014, pp. 198–200.

21. Tokaev, Kassym-Jomart. A Life Dedicated to Love and Scholarship. Problems of Post-Soviet Space. No. 2, 2014, pp. 201–203.

22. Kulishenko, Natalia. Feminine Power of Diplomacy. Royals Magazine. No. 1, 2015, pp. 54–56.

23. Whole World in Natalia Bazhanova's Books. University Book. January–February 2015, pp. 68–69.

24. Morgulov, Igor. Natasha Remains with Us. International Law Courier. No. 5, October 2014, pp. 3–7.

25. Davydov, Evgeny. We Have a Strong Diplomacy. Russian Peacemaker (Internet mass media), 10 February 2015.

26. Dubinskaya, Maria. A Person and a Cause. In Memoriam: The Highest Mark for Natasha. In Memory of Natalia Evgenievna Bazhanova. A Window to Moscow (Internet mass media). 19 March 2015.

27. Alma Mater. No. 3, 2015, pp. 17–30.

In Memoriam

Tokaev, Kassym-Jomart. A Life Dedicated to Love and Scholarship.

Li Hui. Natalia Evgenievna's Books Are the Best Remembrance of Her.

Liao Weijing. The Better Half.

Shi Ze. Even God Is Jealous of Talents.

Lee In-ho. Blessed Memory of Natalia Bazhanova.

Dr Bang. Her Works Are True Classics.

Tshangchu Rhee. She Charmed All.

Iwashita, Akihiro. Intelligence and Elegance.

Akaha, Tsuneo. A Precious Scholar.

Wishnick, Elizabeth. A Model for Us All.

Moltz, Clay. A Tremendous Intellectual Impact.

Mansourov, Alexander. There Is No Replacement.

Vassilieva (Scherbakova), Anna. The Bells of Grieving.

Rivera, David. The World Will be Worse Off without Her.

Rudov, Georgy. Her Shy Smile Remains with Us... A Word About Natalia Evgenievna Bazhanova

28. Russia and the World. Herald of the Diplomatic Academy of the MFA of the RF. No. 1(3), 2015, pp. 101–131.

In Memoriam. Reminiscences about Natalia Evgenievna Bazhanova.

Chudodeev, Alexander. A Few Introductory Words.

Tokaev, Kassym-Jomart. A Life Dedicated to Love and Scholarship.

Akaev, Askar. The Unbearable Pain.

Dvornikova, Anna. My Second Mother.

Dr Bang. Her Works Are True Classics.

Vassilieva (Scherbakova), Anna. The Bells of Grieving.

Wilmington, Carl. An Ideal Wife.

Wishnick, Elizabeth. A Model for Us All.

Iwashita, Akihiro. Intelligence and Elegance.

Lee In-ho. Blessed Memory of Natalia Bazhanova.

Li Hui. Natalia Evgenievna's Books Are the Best Remembrance of Her.

Tshangchu Rhee. She Charmed All.

Liao Weijing. The Better Half.

Mansourov, Alexander. There Is No Replacement.

Moltz, Clay. A Tremendous Intellectual Impact.

Parker, John. Exquisite.

Potter, William. The Apple of Evgeny's Eye.

Rivera, David, The World Will be Worse Off without Her.

Xue Fuqi. We Gain Wisdom from Natalia Bazhanova's Books.

Akaha, Tsuneo. A Precious Scholar.

Shi Ze. Even God Is Jealous of Talents.

29. An Interview of Alexander Chudodeev with Archpriest Vladimir (Volgin), Superior of the Moscow Temple of Sofia the Wisdom of God in Sredniye Sadovniki. Natasha's Immortal Soul. Royals Magazine. No. 2, 2015, pp. 70–72.

30. Philosophic Sciences. No. 1, 2015, pp. 153–157.

Memoria. Natalia Evgenievna Bazhanova.

From the Editorial Board. In Memory of a Scholar.

Kirabaev, Nur. The Shining of her Soul.

Deryugina, Olga. Cruel and Unfair.

Vassilieva (Scherbakova), Anna. The Bells of Grieving.

31. Russia and the World. Herald of the Diplomatic Academy of the MFA of the RF. Russia and the World. No. 2 (4), 2015, pp. 111–140.

In Memoriam. From the Reminiscences about Natalia Evgenievna Bazhanova.

Benderskiy, Igor. A Year After.

Torkunov, Anatoly. A Monument Not Made by Human Hands (About Natalia Bazhanova's Intellectual Heritage).

Toloraya, Georgii. Dedicated to the Memory of a Lady of Great Intellect.

Vorontsov, Alexander. Natalia Evgenievna Bazhanova in My Life.

Lukin, Alexander. In the Stream of Her Kindness.

Suslina Svetlana. First Teacher.

Timonin, Alexander. A Great Loss.

Mikheev, Vasily. The Memory that Demands the Cause Be Continued.

Karlov, Andrei. An Example to Follow.

Ermolov, Valery. "Natasha ton-muh" or "Comrade Natasha".

Denisov, Valery. No, She Isn’t Gone.

32. International Economy. No. 5-6, 2015, pp. 89–102.

From the Editorial Board. Natalia Bazhanova – An Interrupted Flight.

Torkunov, Anatoly. Natalia Bazhanova and Her Creative Heritage.

33. Lukin, Alexander. In the Stream of Her Kindness // Emerging China and the Future of Russia. Works on China and the Russian-Chinese Relations. Moscow, International Relations. 2015, pp. 674–678.

34. Khalimov, Nikolai. How Personal Became Common. Argumenty nedeli. 30 July 2015.

35. Saveliev, Alexey. A Diplomat's Path. Istoria. No. 9, September 2015, pp. 32–37.

36. Zvereva, Tatiana. About Russia in the World and about the World in Russia (In Memory of Natalia Bazhanova). Polis. No. 5, 2015, pp. 182–185.

37. Denisov, Valery; Ivashentsov, Gleb; Minaev Andrei. An Outstanding Academic Contribution of N.E. Bazhanova to the Contemporary Korean Studies (Part 1). Representative Power. No. 5-6, 2015, pp. 49–51.

38. Vnukov, Constantin; Voropaeva, Olga; Greshnykh, Valery; Zhuravlev, Yury. Scholarly Works of N.E. and E.P. Bazhanovs as a Source to Understand the Development of the Russian-Chinese Diplomacy (Part 1). Representative Power. No.  5-6, 2015, pp. 52–55.

39. Zakharov, Vladimir; Zakharova, Irina; Chumakovskiy Igor. Scholarly Works of N.E. and E.P. Bazhanovs as a Source to Understand the Development of the Russian-Chinese Diplomacy (Part 2). Representative Power. No.  5-6, 2015, pp. 56–61.

40. Efimovich, Ekaterina. Minsk through the Radiant Image of Natalia Bazhanova. http://hramvs.by/sobytiya/minsk-cherez-svetlyi-obraz-natali-bazhanovoi. 8 December 2015, pp. 1–6.

41. Zhdanovich, Vladimir. A Diplomacy with Excellence. Minsk Courier. 9 December 2015, p. 7.

42. The Diplomatic Club at the Main Book Store. Biblio Globus Book Digest. No. 12-01, December–January 2015 – 2016, pp. 10–11.

43. Ermolov, Valery; Karlov Andrei; Timonin, Alexander. An Outstanding Academic Contribution of N.E. Bazhanova to the Contemporary Korean Studies (Part 2). Representative Power. No. 7-8, 2015, pp. 42–47.

44. Avdeev, Alexander. My Wonderful Classmate. Royals Magazine. No. 4, 2015, pp. 62–63.

45. Evening in Memory of Natalia Evgenievna Bazhanova on 7 June 2015 (speakers: E.P.Bazhanov, Father Vladimir, A.A.Akaev, A.L.Manilov, O.A.Zimarin, O.G.Peresypkin, O.P.Ivanov, Zurab Pachulia, G.A.Rudov, T.A.Zakaurtseva, S.E.Ivanov, V.M.Dubinina, T.N.Mozel, O.V.Markova, A.G.Zhuravleva, I.L.Benderskiy, T.V.Zvereva, A.S.Bystrova). Alma Mater. No. 4, 2016, pp. 18–37.

46. Presentation of the book "Natalia Bazhanova: A Radiant Life". Diplomatic Academy, MFA, Russia, 24 September 2015 (speakers: T.A.Zakaurtseva, E.P.Bazhanov, Park Ro-byug, A.A.Akaev, G.D.Toloraya, V.Yu.Zakharov, V.I.Kharichev, G.S.Charodeev, S.E.Ivanov, I.L.Benderskiy, O.G.Peresypkin, T.V.Zvereva, A.Yu.Chudodeev, G.A.Rudov). Alma Mater. No. 4, 2016, pp. 38–51.

47. Presentation of the book "Natalia Bazhanova: A Radiant Life". "Biblio Globus" book store, 21 October 2015 (speakers: E.P.Bazhanov, Zhang Zhonghua, S.G.Luzianin). Alma Mater. No. 4, 2016, pp. 52–65.

48. Two Presentations of One Book. From the Editorial Board. Russia and the World. Herald of the Diplomatic Academy of the MFA of the RF. No. 4(6), 2015, pp. 51–52.

49. Presentation of the book "Natalia Bazhanova: A Radiant Life". Diplomatic Academy, MFA, Russia, 24 September 2015 (speakers: T.A.Zakaurtseva, Park Ro-byug, A.A.Akaev, G.D.Toloraya, V.Yu.Zakharov, V.I.Kharichev, G.S.Charodeev, S.E.Ivanov, I.L.Benderskiy, O.G.Peresypkin, T.V.Zvereva, A.Yu.Chudodeev, G.A.Rudov, E.P.Bazhanov). Russia and the World. Herald of the Diplomatic Academy of the MFA of the RF. No. 4(6), 2015, pp. 53–70.

50. Presentation of the book "Natalia Bazhanova: A Radiant Life" at "Biblio Globus" book store, 21 October 2015 (speakers: E.P.Bazhanov, L.M.Mlechin). Russia and the World. Herald of the Diplomatic Academy of the MFA of the RF. No. 4(6), 2015, pp. 71–98.

51. Bazhanov, Evgeny. "The Korean U-turn" of Y.M. Primakov. Russia and the World. Herald of the Diplomatic Academy of the MFA of the RF. No. 1(7), 2015, pp. 31–50.

52. Evgeny Bazhanov about a Great Daughter of the Caucasus with the Worldwide Recognition. An interview to Editor-in-Chief of "The Herald of the Caucasus" Information and Analysis Agency M.S.Sidelnikova. 20 October 2016. At: http://www.vestikavkaza.ru/interview/Evgeniy-Bazhanov-o-velikoy-bakinke-s-mirovym-imenem.html.

53. Evgeny Bazhanov on Personal Matters through the Prism of the Era. See. No. 51. At: http://www.vestikavkaza.ru/interview/Evgeniy-Bazhanov-o-lichnom-skvoz-prizmu-epokhi.html.

Films 
1.  "Natalia Bazhanova: A Radiant Life". December, 2014. Biblio Globus – Diplomatic Academy of the MFA of the RF. 0:37.

YouTube Channel:

https://www.youtube.com/watch?v=TUHgTW3f9rU&index=13&list=PLGzBWKUdY7WbfWsoymxYNQFBZIcMTrSgq

2.  Interviews regarding the film "Natalia Bazhanova: A Radiant Life" (Producer: "Biblio Globus"). 2:10.

YouTube Channel:

https://www.youtube.com/watch?v=n80vFAEgrog&index=11&list=PLGzBWKUdY7WbfWsoymxYNQFBZIcMTrSgq

3.  Evening in Memory of Natalia Bazhanova. Ladies’ Sitting Room of the Diplomatic Club, "Biblio Globus" book store. 18 December 2014. Recording: "Biblio Globus". 1:34.

YouTube Channel:

https://www.youtube.com/watch?v=orJvCYdm82c&index=12&list=PLGzBWKUdY7WbfWsoymxYNQFBZIcMTrSgq

4.  Evening in Memory of Natalia Bazhanova. Ladies’ Sitting Room of the Diplomatic Club, "Biblio Globus" book store. 18 December 2014. Recording: The Diplomatic Academy. 1:34.

YouTube Channel:

https://www.youtube.com/watch?v=lEYXyr5kofQ&index=14&list=PLGzBWKUdY7WbfWsoymxYNQFBZIcMTrSgq

5.  Natalia Bazhanova: A Radiant Life. Record of the Evening in Memory of Natalia Bazhanova. Ladies’ Sitting Room of the Diplomatic Club, "Biblio Globus" book store. 18 December 2014. 2:12.

YouTube Channel:

https://www.youtube.com/watch?v=etHm2hxfk-8&index=10&list=PLGzBWKUdY7WbfWsoymxYNQFBZIcMTrSgq

6.  USA 1979. A documentary with music. 18:13; 48:00.

YouTube Channel:

https://www.youtube.com/watch?v=T3nUXkN-Ij4&index=8&list=PLGzBWKUdY7WbfWsoymxYNQFBZIcMTrSgq

7.  USA 1992. A documentary with music. 4:01; 9:44.

YouTube Channel:

https://www.youtube.com/watch?v=ZS4-KECDZ-I&index=7&list=PLGzBWKUdY7WbfWsoymxYNQFBZIcMTrSgq

8.  Singapore 1992. A documentary with music. 0:54.

YouTube Channel:

https://www.youtube.com/watch?v=USYwPlOSQog&index=22&list=PLGzBWKUdY7WbfWsoymxYNQFBZIcMTrSgq

9.  Israel 1993. A documentary with music. 3:19.

YouTube Channel:

https://www.youtube.com/watch?v=hEZxyUxna8A&index=15&list=PLGzBWKUdY7WbfWsoymxYNQFBZIcMTrSgq

10.  USA 1994. A documentary with music. 2:18.

YouTube Channel:

https://www.youtube.com/watch?v=fzu4Y2KytL8&index=9&list=PLGzBWKUdY7WbfWsoymxYNQFBZIcMTrSgq

11.  New Zealand and Japan 1994. A documentary with music. 4:02.

YouTube Channel:

https://www.youtube.com/watch?v=4O3FRUG8EYE&index=17&list=PLGzBWKUdY7WbfWsoymxYNQFBZIcMTrSgq

12.  Great Britain 1994. A documentary with music. 5:06.

YouTube Channel:

https://www.youtube.com/watch?v=-F5IjSHrbYk&index=18&list=PLGzBWKUdY7WbfWsoymxYNQFBZIcMTrSgq

13.  South Korea 1994. A documentary with music. 0:58.

YouTube Channel:

https://www.youtube.com/watch?v=H27v4JIAIYE&index=21&list=PLGzBWKUdY7WbfWsoymxYNQFBZIcMTrSgq

14.  Germany 1995. A documentary with music. 2:31.

YouTube Channel:

https://www.youtube.com/watch?v=2k6y8WScfsI&index=19&list=PLGzBWKUdY7WbfWsoymxYNQFBZIcMTrSgq

15.  Austria 1997. A documentary with music. 1:48.

YouTube Channel:

https://www.youtube.com/watch?v=xgzebiR-9n8&index=23&list=PLGzBWKUdY7WbfWsoymxYNQFBZIcMTrSgq

16.  60th birthday 2007. Part 1. 0:44.

YouTube Channel:

https://www.youtube.com/watch?v=J8cC69vwZQI&index=20&list=PLGzBWKUdY7WbfWsoymxYNQFBZIcMTrSgq

17.  60th birthday 2007. Part 2. 0:45.

YouTube Channel:

https://www.youtube.com/watch?v=9dGXmJ0qCvA&index=16&list=PLGzBWKUdY7WbfWsoymxYNQFBZIcMTrSgq

18.  Memorial Day of Natalia Bazhanova. Diplomatic Academy of the MFA of the RF. "Khalva" Restaurant. 7 June 2015. 1:48.

YouTube Channel:

https://www.youtube.com/watch?v=tb_d5XvT400&index=6&list=PLGzBWKUdY7WbfWsoymxYNQFBZIcMTrSgq

19.  Presentation of the book "Natalia Bazhanova: A Radiant Life". Diplomatic Academy of the MFA of the RF. 24 September 2015. 1:36.

YouTube Channel:

https://www.youtube.com/watch?v=bt3V2OS9yi0&list=PLGzBWKUdY7Wa57slcOs9qzS3slxwcgOqX&index=2

20.  Presentation of the book "Natalia Bazhanova: A Radiant Life". Diplomatic Club, "Biblio Globus" book store. 21 October 2015. 1:50.

YouTube Channel:

https://www.youtube.com/watch?v=eeeN12GQcCw&index=9&list=PLGzBWKUdY7Wa57slcOs9qzS3slxwcgOqX

21.  USA and Japan. A documentary. 0:29.

22.  Presentation of the book "Natalia Bazhanova: A Radiant Life". M.Rudomino Library for Foreign Literature. Moscow, 4 February 2016. 1:48.

YouTube Channel:

https://www.youtube.com/watch?v=nH4nUQdgZAY&list=PLGzBWKUdY7Wa57slcOs9qzS3slxwcgOqX&index=1

23.  Great Britain’94, Germany’95, Austria’97. 0:34.

YouTube Channel:

https://www.youtube.com/watch?v=iD6fD4ShSzE&index=3&list=PLGzBWKUdY7WbfWsoymxYNQFBZIcMTrSgq

24.  USA 1979; New Zealand, Japan 1994; South Korea 1994. 0:29.

YouTube Channel:

https://www.youtube.com/watch?v=NQT9_ANklhE&index=5&list=PLGzBWKUdY7WbfWsoymxYNQFBZIcMTrSgq

25.  Video report on the opening of the Natalia Evgenievna Bazhanova Memorial on 14 May 2016, in Moscow (Troekurovo Cemetery). 24:36.

YouTube Channel:

http://www.youtube.com/watch?v=RWKgWRyLHVY

Evgeny Bazhanov's Facebook: publications on 18 May 2016, 14:00.

26.  Video report on the event held on the occasion of the opening of the Natalia Evgenievna Bazhanova Memorial on 14 May 2016, in Moscow (Troekurovo Cemetery). 1:44:00.

YouTube Channel:

http://www.youtube.com/watch?v=FdbHETxzOxk

Evgeny Bazhanov's Facebook: publications on 19 May 2016 (in two parts).

27.  Documentary entitled "Great Diplomats Are the Best Teachers". 60:00. Author: Leonid Mlechin.

YouTube Channel:

http://www.youtube.com/watch?v=6rgr-AYD2Go

Evgeny Bazhanov's Facebook: publications on 6 October 2016.

28.  The Diplomatic Academy published books about the outstanding daughter of Baku. Evgeny Bazhanov's interview to Editor-in-Chief of "The Herald of the Caucasus" Information and Analysis Agency M.S.Sidelnikova. 20 October 2016.

YouTube Channel:

http://www.vestikavkaza.ru/video/Dipakademia-Rossii-vypustila-knigi-o-vydayushcheysya-bakinke.html.

29.  Presentation of the multivolume book "A Moment and Eternity" (vv. 1, 2, 3, 4). The Diplomatic Academy of the MFA of the RF. 1 December 2016.

YouTube Channel:

https://www.youtube.com/watch?v=aIPthkyAkfc

30.  Documentary entitled "Natalia Bazhanova. Horizons Following Horizons". 56:00. Author Leonid Mlechin.

YouTube Channel:

https://www.youtube.com/watch?v=S7Zs-mF78tA&list=PLGzBWKUdY7WZ-odKLTX2W9rsi77scLkJM&index=12

31.  Memorial Evening to celebrate the 70th Anniversary of Natalia Bazhanova. "National" Hotel, Moscow Hall, Moscow, 4 January 2017.

YouTube Channel:

https://www.youtube.com/watch?v=iWFkJjRU4M0&list=PLGzBWKUdY7WbfWsoymxYNQFBZIcMTrSgq&index=1. 37:00.

YouTube Channel:

https://www.youtube.com/watch?v=9ozAEenv6YQ&index=2&list=PLGzBWKUdY7WbfWsoymxYNQFBZIcMTrSgq. 1:07:23.

TV broadcasts 
1.  Russia Today (Arab language division). TV program, author: Halid.

2.  TV channel "Max Portal. Sochi". Program "Exclusive". Author and presenter – a well-known TV presenter, Honored Actress of the Russian Federation Alla Zhuravlyova. Broadcasting time: 22, 26 February 2016, STS and TNT TV channels, Sochi.

3.  Coverage of the presentation of the book "Natalia Bazhanova: A Radiant Life" at the Diplomatic Academy of the MFA of the RF on 24 September 2015. REN-TV TV channel, in the news on 25 September at 8:30 p.m., 12:30 p.m. and so forth.

4.  EFKATE TV channel, Sochi. Program "Once in the city of S...", "A chapter in history. Peter Bazhanov". 58 min. 2 parts. Author: Lyudmila Ishchenko. Broadcasting time: October, 2015, 6 broadcasts. 21 November 2015. Regular broadcasts in 2016, 2017.

5.  ORT TV channel ("Obshchestvennoye televideniye Rossii" – "Public Television of Russia"). A documentary entitled "Great Diplomats Are the Best Teachers". 60:00. Author: well-known journalist, international observer and TV moderator Leonid Mlechin. Broadcasting time: 6 October 2016, 22:00-23:00.

Sculptures and paintings 
1.  Pachulia, Zurab. Painting with the image of Natasha. Presented by the artist as a gift on 7 June 2015.

2.  Fetyukov, Michael. Memorial (monument) to Natalia Bazhanova. Troekurovo Cemetery, area No. 23. Official opening – 14 May 2016.

Reviews of A Moment and Eternity 
1. "Eurasian Prize" in "The Meaning of the Universe" nomination for the book "A Moment and Eternity", vv. 1-2. Golden Laureate Evgeny Bazhanov. Given: 9 September 2016.

2. Makarenko, Alexander. Laureates of Eurasia. Nezavisimaia gazeta – Ex Libris. 13 October 2016, p. 3.

3. Evgeny Bazhanov about a Great Daughter of the Caucasus with the Worldwide Recognition. An interview to Editor-in-Chief of "The Herald of the Caucasus" Information and Analysis Agency M.S.Sidelnikova. 20 October 2016. At: http://www.vestikavkaza.ru/interview/Evgeniy-Bazhanov-o-velikoy-bakinke-s-mirovym-imenem.html.

4. Evgeny Bazhanov on Personal Matters Through the Prism of the Era. See. No. 3. At: http://www.vestikavkaza.ru/interview/Evgeniy-Bazhanov-o-lichnom-skvoz-prizmu-epokhi.html.

5. Zorina, Svetlana. Who Knows? The Eternity or a Moment... Book Industry. No 9-10, November–December, 2016, pp. 40–41.

6. Benderskiy, Igor. People and Countries in the Framework of the Epoch. Russia and the World. Herald of the Diplomatic Academy of the MFA of the RF. No. 3(9), 2016.

External links 
 Official web site of The Diplomatic Academy of the MFA of the Russian Federation (http://www.dipacademy.ru)
 Biography at labyrinth.ru (http://www.labyrinth.ru/content/card.asr?cardid=16466) of Natalia Bazhanova.

1947 births
2014 deaths
Russian political scientists
Russian orientalists
Russian women historians
Moscow State Institute of International Relations alumni
Women political scientists